Tikveš plain is situated in central North Macedonia. It is known for an artificial lake, which is the site of the Tikveš Hydroelectric Power Station. It is home to the towns of Kavadarci and Negotino. Famous for its wine, Tikveš is the center of the Macedonian wine production which has been cultivated for more than 120 years. The region is also famous for its yogurt and sour milk.

Environment

Important Bird Area
The lake forms the centre of a 25,500 ha tract, encompassing arable land, forest, shrubland and wetland, that has been designated an Important Bird Area (IBA) by BirdLife International because it supports populations of rock partridges, black storks, Eurasian eagle-owls, Egyptian vultures, short-toed snake-eagles, golden eagles, lesser kestrels, eastern subalpine warblers, western rock nuthatches, eastern black-eared wheatears and black-headed buntings.

Wine industry
A large fertile plain of about  makes up the Tikveš district (part of Povardarie region), located in central North Macedonia and enclosed by mountain highlands on three sides. Spring is shorter here and Autumn is a bit longer and warmer.

The Vardar River, the country's principal river, cuts the valley into western and eastern sections. These two sections are very different in their relief, climate, surface waters, soil quality and flora and fauna. The valley's eastern section is arid and sparsely populated, while the western section is fertile and, compared to that of the east, much more densely populated. This area is also rich in forests, minerals and pastureland, with vineyards and orchards.

District's wine growing characteristics
average sum of active temperatures during vegetation 
absolute maximum temperature 
absolute minimum temperature 
average air temperature during the vegetation period 
average late spring frosts occur to 23 March, early autumn frosts from 4 November
average rainfall per year 
average rainfall in the period of vegetation 
sum of sunny hours during vegetation 1750.8

Varieties
As a result of a harmonious climatic and geographic convergence, the Tikveš region is a perfect place for the cultivation of wine (which is locally popular). The region has produced wine for over 2,500 years.

Today, there are predominantly 20 different grape varieties grown in the Tikveš region. The local Smederevka, Vranec and Temjanika comprise 80% of the total grape production. As wine consumers' preferences change globally, the region keep paces with current trends and adjusts its vine varieties accordingly.

See also
Muscat Ottonel
Povardarie
Smederevka
Temjanika (Muscat Blanc à Petits Grains)
Vranec

References

External links
Official Tikveš Winery Website
Come to Macedonia and Your Heart Will Remain Here
Cyber Macedonia
Wines of Macedonia
The Tikves Transformation: from State-Owned Producer to Elite Winery
Tikvesh the Wine Heart of Macedonia
Tanec-Tikfesko video
Kалендарот за Тиквеш со Николина Пишек

Landforms of North Macedonia
Kavadarci Municipality
Negotino Municipality
Plains of Europe
Important Bird Areas of North Macedonia